Luc Jozef Amelie Appermont (born 4 October 1949) is a Flemish television presenter. He started his career on Radio 2 as a radio announcer, he hosted the talent show Observatory. From 1976 until 1990 he was the regular Belgian commentator for the Dutch speaking region in the Eurovision Song Contest.

In 1990, Appermont left BRT and went to the commercial broadcaster VTM, where he hosted his talkshow Luc. He is a native of Bilzen, Belgium.

Appermont at various points also hosted the Belgian versions of both Jeopardy! and Wheel of Fortune.

References

External links 
 Luc Appermont's bio

1949 births
Living people
People from Bilzen
Belgian LGBT broadcasters
Flemish television presenters
Belgian game show hosts
Belgian television talk show hosts